Tereshkova Street is a street in Akademgorodok of Novosibirsk, Russia.

History
The street was previously called Obvodnaya Street or Romantikov Street.
 
March 10, 1959, the first tenants moved into the three-story house on the street.

In September 1959, school, kindergarten and dormitory were built on the street.

Scientist Viktor Sharapov recalled that in 1960–1962 the main scientific settlement of Akademgorodok was concentrated in 3 or 4 houses on this street.

In 1964, the street was named after Valentina Tereshkova, the first woman to have flown in space.

Organizations of SB RAS
 Presidium of SB RAS
 Institute Archeology and Ethnography

Gallery

Notable residents
 Pavel Kharlamov (1924–2001) was a Soviet and Ukrainian scientist in the field of mechanics.
 Pelageya Polubarinova-Kochina (1899–1999) was a Soviet and Russian mathematician.

References

Streets in Novosibirsk
Sovetsky District, Novosibirsk